Yaka Castle (also known as Güdübeş Castle) is a castle ruin in Mersin Province, Turkey. Although its name is Güdübeş, it is popularly known as Yaka referring to a former village to the east of the castle.

Geography

History
The castle was built by Crusaders in medieval times and nothing is known about its history.

The plan
The plan of the castle is square. But only two walls (north and west) are partially standing. There are three  observation towers.  The plan of the one at the south east corner  is square, the plan of the one at the east is circular and the plan of the one at north east corner is polygonal. Because the masonry is so dissimilar to that used by the Armenians and the Byzantines in Cilicia and because parts of this coastal region were occupied by the Knights Hospitaller in the late 12th and 13th centuries, it is possible that the site was constructed by the Crusaders.

References

External links
For the images
Carefully documented photographs and plan of Yaka castle

Castles in Mersin Province
Ruined castles in Turkey
Crusader castles